Wikindx is a free bibliographic and quotations/notes management and article authoring system (Virtual Research Environment) designed either for single use (on a variety of operating systems) or multi-user collaborative use across the internet. Wikindx falls within the category of reference management software, but also provides functionality to write notes and entire papers. Developed under the GNU GPL license, the project homepage can be found at sourceforge.net and the required files/updates are available for download there.

Other features
 Support UTF-8 encoding and include translations (English, French, German, Spanish, Italian, Russian, Ukrainian).
 Allows multiple attachments for each bibliographic resource.
 Quarantining and embargoes of attachments and resources supported.
 Comprehensive search on resources and attachments.
 Store quotations, paraphrases and ideas with your references.
 Can export a bibliography in various bibliographic styles (APA, Chicago, IEEE for example).
 Allows users to edit or create bibliographic styles through a graphical interface.
 Can import and export other bibliographic formats including BibTeX and EndNote format.
 Export bibliographies to RTF for use in Word/OpenOffice.org etc.
 Modular plugin architecture so easily customizable (PHP) -- plugins include WYSIWYG word processor, import/export bibliographic formats, PubMed import.
 Google Docs integration

See also

 Comparison of reference management software for some comparisons with similar packages.

References

Bibliography 

Reference management software
Free reference management software